Skol is a global beer brand.

Skol or SKOL may also refer to:
Skol (album), a 1979 live album by Oscar Peterson
"Skol, Vikings", the fight song of the Minnesota Vikings
Skol Airlines, a Russian charter airline
Skol Company, a 20th-century American manufacturer of sun protection products
South Kansas and Oklahoma Railroad's reporting mark
Skol, a vodka brand

See also
 Skoal (disambiguation)
 Skal (disambiguation)
 Skoll (disambiguation)